Charlotte is a 13-episode 2015 anime television series produced by P.A. Works and Aniplex and directed by Yoshiyuki Asai. The story was originally conceived by Jun Maeda, who also wrote the screenplay and composed the music with Hikarishuyo and the group Anant-Garde Eyes; Na-Ga provided the original character design. Both Maeda and Na-Ga are from the visual novel brand Key. The discography of Charlotte consists of two studio albums, three singles and one soundtrack.

The core of the discography is the original soundtrack album produced by Key Sounds Label in 2015. The music on the soundtrack was composed and arranged by Jun Maeda and members of Anant-Garde Eyes. There are two in-story bands: How-Low-Hello featuring vocals by Maaya Uchida, and Zhiend featuring vocals by Marina. One album and one single were released for both bands in 2015. A theme song single was also released in 2015.

Albums

Smells Like Tea, Espresso
Smells Like Tea, Espresso is a studio album by How-Low-Hello released on September 30, 2015 in Japan by Key Sounds Label bearing the catalog number KSLA-0107. The album contains one disc with 12 tracks sung by Maaya Uchida. The album is composed by Jun Maeda and arranged by Tomohiro Takeshita. The song "Hand with Blood" is a re-arrangement of Maeda's 2003 song "Spica".

Echo
Echo is a studio album by Zhiend released on October 14, 2015 in Japan by Key Sounds Label bearing the catalog numbers KSLA-0108–0109. The album contains two discs with 12 tracks each sung by Marina. While the music on both discs is the same, the lyrics are different: one has English lyrics and the other has Japanese lyrics. The album is composed and arranged by Hikarishuyo, with lyrics written by Jun Maeda.

Charlotte Original Soundtrack
The Charlotte Original Soundtrack was released on November 4, 2015  in Japan by Key Sounds Label bearing the catalog numbers KSLA-0110–0111. The album contains two discs composed and produced by Jun Maeda and members of Anant-Garde Eyes. All of the tracks were arranged by Anant-Garde Eyes.

Singles

Bravely You / Yakeochinai Tsubasa
"Bravely You /  is a split single released on August 26, 2015 in Japan by Key Sounds Label bearing the catalog numbers KSLA-0103 (limited edition) and KSLA-0104 (regular edition). The two title tracks, performed by Lia and Aoi Tada respectively, were used as opening and ending themes to the Charlotte anime series. Each song is presented in full length, TV size, and instrumental versions. The single is written by Jun Maeda and arranged by the group Anant-Garde Eyes. The limited edition contained a bonus DVD containing a no-credit version of the opening and ending animation sequences used in the anime.

Rakuen Made / Hatsunetsu Days
 is a single by How-Low-Hello, featuring songs sung by Maaya Uchida, released on September 2, 2015 in Japan by Key Sounds Label bearing the catalog number KSLA-0105. The single is composed by Jun Maeda and arranged by Tomohiro Takeshita.

Trigger
"Trigger" is a single by Zhiend, featuring songs sung by Marina, released on September 9, 2015 in Japan by Key Sounds Label bearing the catalog number KSLA-0106. The single is composed and arranged by Hikarishuyo, with lyrics written by Jun Maeda.

Charts

References

Anime soundtracks
Discographies of Japanese artists
Key Sounds Label